Kenneth M. Pierce is an American journalist and contributor to Time.

His reporting has included coverage of:
American postsecondary education
the Tamil separatist movement
Cold War proxy wars

References

Living people
Year of birth missing (living people)